Skala Eresou, also transliterated as Skala Eressou, is a seaside village on the island of Lesbos in Greece, part of the community of Eresos. Since the 1980s it has become a popular destination for lesbian tourists.

Overview

"Skala Eresou" means "the skala of Eresos", where skala means "landing place for boats".

The village has two access roads, one from the north and one from the west. Both lead towards the central square, which is paved with flagstones, but due to the one-way system, vehicle access is restricted. On the outskirts of the village, there are several large car parks.

The volcanic character of the west side of Lesbos is shown in the dark grey color of the beach, which extends for almost three kilometers from a small harbour in the east to the headland in the west. In 2006, the beach of Skala Eresou was awarded the Blue Flag, for the cleanliness of its waters and its beach.

There are many small family hotels and self-catering apartments for rent within the village or on the outskirts. There is also a dispensary, a pharmacy, a large number of restaurants and bars with several tourist offices. Every summer, Eresos has a large number of visitors, both Greeks and foreigners. Many lesbian women make the pilgrimage to Skala Eresou in order to visit the birthplace of Sappho.

The village hosts alternative events throughout the summer, including tai-chi lessons, reiki, shiatsu or ayurvedic massage. A "women festival" takes place in Skala Eresou every September, attracting women tourists.

Daily buses run in the summer and the village can be reached by taxis from the airport or the port of Mytilene for around 100 euro.

Famous people

The town is famed for being the birthplace of Sappho, the legendary lyric poet also called the "Tenth Muse." Skala Eresou was also the home for the ancient Greek philosopher Phanias, who was a pupil of Aristotle, and of Theophrastus, the father of classical botany. The ancient city walls are still visible from when it was an important trading centre.

References

Populated places in Lesbos